Padur is a village in the Udupi district of Karnataka. It is best known for being one of the locations of the Indian strategic petroleum reserves.

References

Villages in Udupi district